Rahdar Rural District is a rural district (dehestan) in the Central District of Rudan County, Hormozgan Province, Iran. At the 2006 census, its population was 2,406, in 558 families. The rural district has 37 villages.

References 

Rural Districts of Hormozgan Province
Rudan County